The 1987 Cantabrian regional election was held on Wednesday, 10 June 1987, to elect the 2nd Regional Assembly of the autonomous community of Cantabria. All 39 seats in the Regional Assembly were up for election. The election was held simultaneously with regional elections in 12 other autonomous communities and local elections all throughout Spain, as well as the 1987 European Parliament election.

The election was a victory for the People's Alliance (AP), which despite the breakup of the People's Coalition with the People's Democratic Party (PDP) and the Liberal Party (PL), remained the Assembly's largest force, albeit losing the absolute majority of seats it had held in the previous parliament. As in other communities, the Spanish Socialist Workers' Party (PSOE) lost votes and seats, while the Democratic and Social Centre (CDS) and Regionalist Party of Cantabria (PRC) made gains.

The legislature would be marked by dissensions between the elected President of Cantabria, Juan Hormaechea, and his own party AP (from 1989 the People's Party). In 1989 the PP would demand Hormaechea's resignation, but he would continue in a government formed by independents. In December 1990, he will be forced out by a no-confidence motion supported by PP, PSOE, PRC and CDS, which would result in a coalition government headed by Socialist Jaime Blanco being formed until the 1991 election.

Overview

Electoral system
The Regional Assembly of Cantabria was the devolved, unicameral legislature of the autonomous community of Cantabria, having legislative power in regional matters as defined by the Spanish Constitution and the Cantabrian Statute of Autonomy, as well as the ability to vote confidence in or withdraw it from a President of the Regional Deputation. Voting for the Parliament was on the basis of universal suffrage, which comprised all nationals over 18 years of age, registered in Cantabria and in full enjoyment of their political rights.

The 39 members of the Regional Assembly of Cantabria were elected using the D'Hondt method and a closed list proportional representation, with an electoral threshold of five percent of valid votes—which included blank ballots—being applied regionally.

The electoral law provided that parties, federations, coalitions and groupings of electors were allowed to present lists of candidates. However, groupings of electors were required to secure the signature of at least 1 percent of the electors registered in Cantabria. Electors were barred from signing for more than one list of candidates. Concurrently, parties and federations intending to enter in coalition to take part jointly at an election were required to inform the relevant Electoral Commission within ten days of the election being called.

Election date
The term of the Regional Assembly of Cantabria expired four years after the date of its previous election. Election day was to take place between the thirtieth and the sixtieth day from the date of expiry of parliament. The previous election was held on 8 May 1983, which meant that the legislature's term would have expired on 8 May 1987. The election was required to take place no later than the sixtieth day from the date of expiry of parliament, setting the latest possible election date for the Parliament on Sunday, 7 July 1987.

The Regional Assembly of Cantabria could not be dissolved before the date of expiry of parliament except in the event of an investiture process failing to elect a regional President within a two-month period from the first ballot. In such a case, the Regional Assembly was to be automatically dissolved and a snap election called, with elected deputies merely serving out what remained of their four-year terms.

Opinion polls
The table below lists voting intention estimates in reverse chronological order, showing the most recent first and using the dates when the survey fieldwork was done, as opposed to the date of publication. Where the fieldwork dates are unknown, the date of publication is given instead. The highest percentage figure in each polling survey is displayed with its background shaded in the leading party's colour. If a tie ensues, this is applied to the figures with the highest percentages. The "Lead" column on the right shows the percentage-point difference between the parties with the highest percentages in a poll. When available, seat projections determined by the polling organisations are displayed below (or in place of) the percentages in a smaller font; 20 seats were required for an absolute majority in the Regional Assembly of Cantabria.

Results

Aftermath

Government formation

1990 motion of no confidence

Notes

References
Opinion poll sources

Other

1987 in Cantabria
Cantabria
Regional elections in Cantabria
June 1987 events in Europe